Old Ways is the 14th studio album by Canadian / American musician and singer-songwriter Neil Young, released on August 12, 1985 on Geffen Records.

Background
Young has referred to this album in interviews as Old Ways II, as he had originally planned to release a country album titled Old Ways in 1983. Young's record label, Geffen, objected to this, asking Young for a "rock 'n roll" album, which Young would give them in the form of 1983's Everybody's Rockin'.

After a lawsuit with Geffen ended in a settlement in favor of Young, he proceeded to complete the unfinished Old Ways by writing a few additional songs to fill it out. Old Ways I would have contained many still-unreleased songs, one of which, "Depression Blues," would later appear on Young's Geffen-era compilation Lucky Thirteen.

The title track and "Get Back to the Country" were released as singles with accompanying music videos, but like with his previous videos, MTV largely ignored them. The album was a near-total commercial and critical failure, and remains one of Young's lowest-selling albums to date. Despite the poor reception, he nonetheless toured Old Ways and played material from it live along with some of his old concert staples.

Track listing

Personnel

Neil Young – guitar, banjo-guitar, harmonica, vocals
Waylon Jennings – guitar, vocals
Willie Nelson – guitar, vocals
Rufus Thibodeaux – fiddle
Ben Keith – pedal steel guitar, dobro
Tim Drummond – bass
Karl Himmel – drums
Joe Allen – electric & upright bass
Ralph Mooney – pedal steel guitar
Hargus "Pig" Robbins – piano
Gordon Terry – fiddle
Joe Osborn – bass
Anthony Crawford – mandolin, vocals
Terry McMillan – harmonica, jew's harp
Béla Fleck – banjo
Bobby Thompson – banjo
David Kirby – guitar
Grant Boatwright – guitar
Johnny Christopher – guitar
Ray Edenton – guitar
Gove Scrivenor – autoharp
Farrell Morris – percussion
Marty Stuart – mandolin
Carl Gorodetzky – violin
Spooner Oldham – piano
Larry Byrom – vocals
Rick Palombi – vocals
Doana Cooper – vocals
Denise Draper – vocals
Gail Davies – vocals
Betsy Hammer – vocals
Pam Rose – vocals
Janis Oliver-Gill – vocals
Mary Ann Kennedy – vocals
Kristine Oliver-Arnold – vocals
Leona Williams – vocals
Strings:
Carl Gorodetsky – leader
George Binkley
John Borg
Roy Christensen
Virginia Christensen
Charles Everett
Larry Harvin
Mark Hembree
Lee Larrison
Betty McDonald
Dennis Molchan
Pamela Sixfin
Mark Tanner
David Vanderkooi
Gary Vanosdale
Carol Walker
Stephanie Woolf
JT Cantwell – assistant engineer

Recording personnel
Neil Young – producer
Ben Keith – producer
David Briggs – producer
Gene Eichelberger – engineer
Keith Odle – second engineer
Clark Schleicher – recording assistant
J.T. Cantwell – recording assistant

Chart performance

References

Neil Young albums
1985 albums
Albums produced by David Briggs (producer)
Geffen Records albums
Albums produced by Elliot Mazer
Albums produced by Ben Keith
Albums produced by Neil Young
Country rock albums by Canadian artists